Textile may refer to:
Textile, any type of material made from fibers or other extended linear materials such as thread or yarn
Textile industry, also known as the "rag trade"
Textile (markup language)
A slang term used by naturists to refer to non-nudists
The Philadelphia College of Textiles & Science (now Philadelphia University)